There are a number of listed buildings in West Yorkshire. The term "listed building", in the United Kingdom, refers to a building or structure designated as being of special architectural, historical, or cultural significance. Details of all the listed buildings are contained in the National Heritage List for England. They are categorised in three grades: Grade I consists of buildings of outstanding architectural or historical interest, Grade II* includes significant buildings of more than local interest and Grade II consists of buildings of special architectural or historical interest. Buildings in England are listed by the Secretary of State for Culture, Media and Sport on recommendations provided by English Heritage, which also determines the grading.

Some listed buildings are looked after by the National Trust or English Heritage while others are in private ownership or administered by trusts.

Listed buildings by grade
 Grade I listed buildings in West Yorkshire
 Grade II* listed buildings in Bradford
 Grade II* listed buildings in Calderdale
 Grade II* listed buildings in Kirklees
 Grade II* listed buildings in Leeds
 Grade II* listed buildings in Wakefield

Listed buildings by civil parish or unparished area

City of Bradford 

Listed buildings in Addingham
Listed buildings in Baildon
Listed buildings in Bingley
Listed buildings in Bradford (Bolton and Undercliffe Ward)
Listed buildings in Bradford (Bowling and Barkerend Ward)
Listed buildings in Bradford (Bradford Moor Ward)
Listed buildings in Bradford (City Ward)
Listed buildings in Bradford (Eccleshill Ward)
Listed buildings in Bradford (Great Horton Ward)
Listed buildings in Bradford (Heaton Ward)
Listed buildings in Bradford (Little Horton Ward)
Listed buildings in Bradford (Manningham Ward)
Listed buildings in Bradford (Royds Ward)
Listed buildings in Bradford (Toller Ward)
Listed buildings in Bradford (Tong Ward)
Listed buildings in Bradford (Trident Parish)
Listed buildings in Bradford (Wibsey Ward)
Listed buildings in Burley in Wharfedale
Listed buildings in Clayton, West Yorkshire
Listed buildings in Cullingworth
Listed buildings in Denholme
Listed buildings in Harden, West Yorkshire
Listed buildings in Haworth, Cross Roads and Stanbury
Listed buildings in Idle and Thackley
Listed buildings in Ilkley
Listed buildings in Keighley
Listed buildings in Menston
Listed buildings in Oxenhope
Listed buildings in Queensbury, West Yorkshire
Listed buildings in Saltaire
Listed buildings in Sandy Lane, West Yorkshire
Listed buildings in Shipley, West Yorkshire
Listed buildings in Silsden
Listed buildings in Steeton with Eastburn
Listed buildings in Thornton and Allerton, West Yorkshire
Listed buildings in Wilsden
Listed buildings in Windhill and Wrose
Listed buildings in Wyke

Calderdale 

Listed buildings in Blackshaw
Listed buildings in Brighouse
Listed buildings in Elland
Listed buildings in Erringden
Listed buildings in Greetland and Stainland
Listed buildings in Halifax, West Yorkshire
Listed buildings in Hebden Royd
Listed buildings in Heptonstall
Listed buildings in Hipperholme and Lightcliffe
Listed buildings in Illingworth, West Yorkshire and Mixenden
Listed buildings in Luddendenfoot
Listed buildings in Northowram
Listed buildings in Ovenden
Listed buildings in Rastrick
Listed buildings in Ripponden
Listed buildings in Ryburn
Listed buildings in Shelf, West Yorkshire
Listed buildings in Sowerby Bridge
Listed buildings in Todmorden (inner area)
Listed buildings in Todmorden (outer areas)
Listed buildings in Wadsworth, West Yorkshire
Listed buildings in Warley, West Yorkshire

Kirklees 

Listed buildings in Almondbury
Listed buildings in Batley
Listed buildings in Cleckheaton
Listed buildings in Colne Valley (central area)
Listed buildings in Colne Valley (eastern area)
Listed buildings in Colne Valley (western area)
Listed buildings in Crosland Moor and Netherton
Listed buildings in Denby Dale
Listed buildings in Dewsbury
Listed buildings in Golcar
Listed buildings in Heckmondwike
Listed buildings in Holme Valley (central area)
Listed buildings in Holme Valley (outer areas)
Listed buildings in Huddersfield (Ashbrow Ward)
Listed buildings in Huddersfield (Dalton Ward)
Listed buildings in Huddersfield (Greenhead Ward)
Listed buildings in Huddersfield (Lindley Ward)
Listed buildings in Huddersfield (Newsome Ward - central area)
Listed buildings in Huddersfield (Newsome Ward - outer areas)
Listed buildings in Kirkburton
Listed buildings in Liversedge and Gomersal
Listed buildings in Meltham
Listed buildings in Mirfield

City of Leeds 

Listed buildings in Aberford and Lotherton
Listed buildings in Alwoodley
Listed buildings in Arthington
Listed buildings in Bardsey cum Rigton
Listed buildings in Barwick in Elmet and Scholes
Listed buildings in Boston Spa
Listed buildings in Bramham cum Oglethorpe
Listed buildings in Bramhope
Listed buildings in Calverley and Farsley
Listed buildings in Carlton, Wharfedale
Listed buildings in Clifford, West Yorkshire
Listed buildings in Collingham, West Yorkshire
Listed buildings in Drighlington
Listed buildings in East Keswick
Listed buildings in Garforth and Swillington
Listed buildings in Gildersome
Listed buildings in Great and Little Preston
Listed buildings in Guiseley and Rawdon
Listed buildings in Harewood, West Yorkshire
Listed buildings in Horsforth
Listed buildings in Kippax, West Yorkshire
Listed buildings in Ledsham, West Yorkshire
Listed buildings in Ledston
Listed buildings in Leeds
Listed buildings in Leeds (Adel and Wharfedale Ward)
Listed buildings in Leeds (Ardsley and Robin Hood Ward)
Listed buildings in Leeds (Armley Ward)
Listed buildings in Leeds (Beeston and Holbeck Ward)
Listed buildings in Leeds (Bramley and Stanningley Ward)
Listed buildings in Leeds (Burmantofts and Richmond Hill Ward)
Listed buildings in Leeds (Chapel Allerton Ward)
Listed buildings in Leeds (City and Hunslet Ward - northern area)
Listed buildings in Leeds (City and Hunslet Ward - southern area)
Listed buildings in Leeds (Cross Gates and Whinmoor Ward)
Listed buildings in Leeds (Farnley and Wortley Ward)
Listed buildings in Leeds (Gipton and Harehills Ward)
Listed buildings in Leeds (Headingley Ward)
Listed buildings in Leeds (Hyde Park and Woodhouse)
Listed buildings in Leeds (Kirkstall Ward)
Listed buildings in Leeds (Middleton Park Ward)
Listed buildings in Leeds (Moortown Ward)
Listed buildings in Leeds (Roundhay Ward)
Listed buildings in Leeds (Temple Newsam Ward)
Listed buildings in Leeds (Weetwood Ward)
Listed buildings in Methley
Listed buildings in Micklefield
Listed buildings in Morley, West Yorkshire
Listed buildings in Otley
Listed buildings in Parlington
Listed buildings in Pool-in-Wharfedale
Listed buildings in Pudsey
Listed buildings in Rothwell, West Yorkshire
Listed buildings in Seacroft and Killingbeck
Listed buildings in Scarcroft
Listed buildings in Shadwell, West Yorkshire
Listed buildings in Sturton Grange
Listed buildings in Thorner and Wothersome
Listed buildings in Thorp Arch
Listed buildings in Walton, Leeds
Listed buildings in Wetherby

City of Wakefield 

Listed buildings in Ackworth, West Yorkshire
Listed buildings in Badsworth
Listed buildings in Castleford
Listed buildings in Chevet, West Yorkshire
Listed buildings in Crigglestone
Listed buildings in Crofton, West Yorkshire
Listed buildings in Darrington, West Yorkshire
Listed buildings in East Hardwick
Listed buildings in Featherstone
Listed buildings in Hemsworth
Listed buildings in Hessle and Hill Top
Listed buildings in Horbury and South Ossett
Listed buildings in Huntwick with Foulby and Nostell
Listed buildings in Knottingley and Ferrybridge
Listed buildings in Normanton, West Yorkshire
Listed buildings in North Elmsall
Listed buildings in Notton
Listed buildings in Ossett
Listed buildings in Pontefract
Listed buildings in Ryhill
Listed buildings in Sharlston
Listed buildings in Sitlington
Listed buildings in South Elmsall
Listed buildings in South Hiendley
Listed buildings in South Kirkby and Moorthorpe
Listed buildings in Stanley and Outwood East
Listed buildings in Thorpe Audlin
Listed buildings in Upton, West Yorkshire
Listed buildings in Wakefield
Listed buildings in Walton, Wakefield
Listed buildings in Warmfield cum Heath
Listed buildings in West Bretton
Listed buildings in Woolley, West Yorkshire
Listed buildings in Wrenthorpe and Outwood West

References

 
West Yorkshire